The Finance Minister of the Palestinian Authority is the head of the Palestinian National Authority (PNA) branch that is in charge of finance. The minister deals with launching audits, collecting tax from Palestinian businesses and overseeing financial aid directed to the PNA. Shukri Bishara is the current Finance Minister.

In April 2007, it was reported that that branch was not receiving satisfactory amounts of money. It was estimated that the PNA gained only $40 million, while $160 million was the amount required.

Functions
The Finance Minister is in charge of 
 Controlling financial activities of the PNA and its expenditure. 
 Supervising, studying and organizing monetary funds and the economic and political analysis of financial aid directed towards the PNA. 
 Supervising and controlling the private capital funds of the PNA.
 Providing the money needed for facing the government's expenditures. 
 Paying the salaries of government employees.
 Managing and settling employee salaries and retirement of civil administration and compensation in accordance with the laws and regulations in force.
 Scrutinizing and overseeing all financial transactions, including accounting principles adopted legally and that follow the principles of the Ministry for accountability and transparency during all stages of its work.
 Monitoring the implementation of the provisions of financial legislation in force.

Finance ministers

See also
 Interior Minister of the Palestinian National Authority
 Foreign Affairs Minister of the Palestinian National Authority
 Prime Minister of the Palestinian National Authority

References

External links
 Official website 

Palestinian
1994 establishments in the Palestinian territories